Ri Ki-yong (also Lee Gi-yeong; May 6, 1896 – August 9, 1984) was a Korean novelist.

Life
Ri Ki-yong was born in Asan, Chunchongnam-do in Korea. He wrote under the name Minchon. Ri attended the Seiisku School of English in Tokyo, Japan, He worked as a member of KAPF in 1925 and was the organizer of the Choson Proletarian Writers' Federation in Seoul as well as the leader of the North Choson Federation of Literature and Arts. 1926, he served as an editor of Light of Joseon (Joseon jigwang), an organ of the Korean Communist Party and a journal promoting proletarian literature. Ri Ki-yong spent more than two years in jail.

After liberation from Japanese colonial rule, Ri moved to North Korea where he was key in creating the orthodox position on literature in North Korea, serving for several years in a key position in North Korean Federation of Literature and Arts. He is reported to have died in August 1988.

Work
The Korea Literature Translation Institute summarizes his contributions to literature:

Like many other North Korean writers, even famous ones, Ri is not well known in his home country, where biographical details of writers are generally not made known to the reading public. Tatiana Gabroussenko describes how, when she interviewed defectors, she:

Works in Translation
German
 Heimat (고향)

Works
 Seohwa〈서화〉
 Ingan suop〈인간수업〉
 Kohyang 〈고향〉Home village 1934
 Shin gaeji〈신개지〉「新開地」 Newly ploughed land serialised 
 Ddang〈땅〉Soil, 1949
 Tuman gang〈두만강〉, Tumen River
 Bom〈봄〉Springtime serialised in the Dong-A Ilbo 1940

See also

Cho Ki-chon
Han Sorya
Korean literature
North Korean literature

References

Further reading
 

1890s births
1984 deaths
North Korean novelists
Literature of Korea under Japanese rule
People from South Chungcheong Province
20th-century novelists
Members of the 1st Supreme People's Assembly
Members of the 2nd Supreme People's Assembly
Members of the 3rd Supreme People's Assembly
Members of the 4th Supreme People's Assembly

Links 

Grave